Pippi Goes on Board may refer to

Pippi Goes on Board (book) a 1946 novel by Astrid Lindgren
Pippi Goes on Board (film) a 1973 film based on the book